An airship or dirigible balloon is a type of aerostat or lighter-than-air aircraft that can navigate through the air under its own power.

Airship or The Airship may also refer to:
 A law-enforcement helicopter in American English
 Airship (ballad), an 1840 ballad
 Airship (band), a British indie rock band
 Airship (company), an American company that provides marketing and branding services
 The Airship, or 100 Years Hence, a 1908 short film by J. Stuart Blackton
 The Airship, a 1982 film by Rainer Simon
 The Airship (Port Blue album), album by Port Blue 2007
The Airship, a map in the social deduction game, Among Us

See also
 
 
 Balloon (aeronautics), any unpowered aircraft that remains aloft using lighter than air gas